Jaroslav Koma (born 19 January 1985) is a Slovak former professional ice hockey defenceman. 

Koma played in the Czech Extraliga for HC Pardubice, HC Litvínov, HC Kometa Brno, BK Mladá Boleslav, HC Vítkovice and HC Slavia Praha. He also played in the Tipsport Liga for HK Dukla Trenčín and HC '05 Banská Bystrica.

Career statistics

References

External links 
 

1985 births
Living people
HC '05 Banská Bystrica players
Deggendorfer SC players
HK Dukla Trenčín players
HC Dynamo Pardubice players
AZ Havířov players
BK Havlíčkův Brod players
HC Kometa Brno players
HC Litvínov players
BK Mladá Boleslav players
HC Olomouc players
Piráti Chomutov players
HC Prešov players
HC Slavia Praha players
Slovak ice hockey defencemen
Stadion Hradec Králové players
HC Vítkovice players
HC Vrchlabí players
Sportspeople from Prešov
Slovak expatriate ice hockey players in the Czech Republic
Slovak expatriate ice hockey players in Germany